The Church of St Decuman in Watchet, Somerset, England has a 13th-century chancel with the rest of the church being from the 15th century. It has been designated as a Grade I listed building.

The dedication is because Watchet is believed to be the place where Saint Decuman was killed.

The church stands on a prominent site overlooking the town. It was restored and reseated by James Piers St Aubyn in 1886–1891, with further internal alterations being made in 1896 when the Caen stone reredos was erected.

Wyndham Chapel

The Wyndham Chapel occupies the east end of the north aisle and is dedicated to the Wyndham family of nearby Orchard Wyndham House, former lords of the manor. Included is a  memorial to Sir John Wyndham (1558 – 1645),   who played an important role in the establishment of defence organisation in the West Country against the threat of the Spanish Armada. Next to his monument is one to his parents, and the chest tomb of his grandparents, with monumental brasses, serves to separate the chapel from the chancel. A mural monument exists with kneeling effigies of two of Sir John's sons, Henry and George, as well as other monuments to the later family of Wyndham.

Burials
John Wyndham (1558–1645)
Florence Wadham (buried alive)
John Sydenham (d. 1521)
Sir John Wyndham (d.1572)

Churchyard

In the churchyard is the remains of a 15th-century stone cross.

See also
 List of Grade I listed buildings in West Somerset
 List of towers in Somerset
 List of ecclesiastical parishes in the Diocese of Bath and Wells

References

External links
 
 St Decuman Church web site

15th-century church buildings in England
Church of England church buildings in West Somerset
Grade I listed churches in Somerset
Grade I listed buildings in West Somerset
Sant Decuman